Anderson Hall, built in 1870, is the oldest building on the campus of Maryville College, Maryville, Tennessee, named for college founder Isaac L. Anderson.

Anderson Hall is a brick building designed in the Second Empire style by architect Benjamin Fahnestock. Funds for its construction were contributed by the Freedmen's Bureau, Pittsburgh businessman William Thaw, and John C. Baldwin of New York.

Originally the college's only building, Anderson Hall is currently used as a classroom building. It was listed on the National Register of Historic Places in 1975. Extensive renovations were started in 2008.

The bell tower of Anderson Hall is depicted in the college's logo.

References

External links
 Anderson Hall Renovation

University and college buildings on the National Register of Historic Places in Tennessee
School buildings completed in 1870
Buildings and structures in Blount County, Tennessee
Maryville College
National Register of Historic Places in Blount County, Tennessee
Second Empire architecture in Tennessee